The 2022–23 Western Michigan Broncos men's ice hockey season is the 49th season of play for the program. They will represent Western Michigan University in the 2022–23 NCAA Division I men's ice hockey season and for the 10th season in the National Collegiate Hockey Conference (NCHC). The Broncos are coached by Pat Ferschweiler, in his second season, and play their home games at Lawson Arena.

Season
The Music City Hockey Classic, which was scheduled to take place in Nashville on November 25th, had to be moved to the Ford Ice Center Bellevue in nearby Bellevue, Tennessee. The change in venue was caused by a water main break at the Bridgestone Arena.

Departures

Recruiting

Roster
As of August 23, 2022.

Standings

Schedule and results

|-
!colspan=12 style=";" | Regular Season

|-
!colspan=12 style=";" | 

|-
!colspan=12 style=";" | Regular Season

|-
!colspan=12 style=";" | 

|-
!colspan=12 style=";" |

Scoring statistics

Goaltending statistics

Rankings

USCHO did not release a poll in weeks 1 and 13.

References

2022-2023
Western Michigan Broncos
Western Michigan Broncos
Western Michigan Broncos
Western Michigan Broncos